Judy's Little No-No (also released as Let's Do It) is a 1969 crime film about a go-go dancer who is targeted by gangsters after coming into possession of a priceless jewel. The film was directed and written by Sherman Price and stars Elisa Ingram, John Davis Lodge, and Joe E. Ross.

External links
 

1969 films
1969 crime drama films
American crime drama films
1960s English-language films
1960s American films